Game Face is a 2001 album by Master P.

Game Face or Gameface may also refer to:

 Game Face (film), a 2015 sports documentary
 "Game Face" (The Shield), a television episode
 GameFace, a British sitcom
 Gameface, a 2003 album by Jay R
 "Game Face", a song by Gov't Mule from Dose, 1998
 Game Face, the original name of Nickelodeon's Unfiltered

See also
 GameFace Labs, an American technology development company